Izan Esterhuizen is a South African rugby union player for the  in the Currie Cup. His regular position is flanker.

Esterhuizen was named in the  side for the 2022 Currie Cup Premier Division.

References

Alumni of Monument High School
South African rugby union players
Living people
Rugby union flankers
Lions (United Rugby Championship) players
Golden Lions players
2001 births